Clara Julia Elisa von Rappard (19 May 1857, Wabern bei Bern - 12 January 1912, Bern) was a Swiss painter. She worked in a wide variety of genres and materials including illustrations, etchings and murals, although she is best known for landscapes and portraits.

Biography 
She was the only child of Jurist  and Albertine Engell (1832–1922) of Mecklenburg, the younger sister of the writer and women's rights activist . She spent her formative years in Wabern bei Bern, then in  Interlaken. Extensive travelling throughout Europe with her parents gave her an acquaintance with art and culture. Her artistic inclinations made themselves apparent at a relatively early age, and she was immediately given formal lessons.  

During the 1880s, she also studied etching with Ludwig von Gleichen-Rußwurm. Other artists who participated, to a greater or lesser degree, in her education included Adolph von Menzel, Paul Friedrich Meyerheim, Arnold Böcklin and Eugène Burnand. For a brief period in the mid 1880s, she operated her own studio in Munich.

She exhibited widely throughout Western Europe and the United States, although she focused on German speaking areas. She held several solo showings there, including ones at the Kunsthalle Bremen (1894),  (also 1894) and the Kunstmuseum Bern (1896). She took second place at the German Exhibition in London (1891) and received a gold medal at the International Women's Exhibition (also in London, 1900).   

She died in 1912, from pneumonia, following a long illness.

Sources/Further reading 
 Jules Coulin: Clara von Rappard. Das Leben einer Malerin. Basel 1920.
 Rappard, Clara von. In: Käthe, Paula und der ganze Rest: Künstlerinnenlexikon. Verein der Berliner Künstlerinnen, Kupfergraben, Berlin 1992, pg.133
 Magdalena Schindler: Clara von Rappard (1857–1912). Anspruch und (Selbst-)Inszenierung einer Künstlerin. Ungedruckte Lizentiatsarbeit, Institut für Kunstgeschichte der Universität Bern, Bern 1995.
 Magdalena Schindler, Walter Bettler: Clara von Rappard - eine Künstlerin zwischen Natur und Phantasie (1857–1912). Interlaken 1997.
 Carola Muyser (Ed.), "Auftrag der Gesellschaft Clara von Rappard" in: Clara von Rappard - Freilichtmalerin 1857-1912.

External links 

 
 
 Website of the Gesellschaft Clara von Rappard

1857 births
1912 deaths
Swiss painters
Swiss landscape painters
Swiss women artists